Putla Villa de Guerrero or simply Putla, is a town and municipality in the State of Oaxaca, Mexico. 
It is part of Putla District in the west of the Sierra Sur Region.

Its original name was Puctitlán, which means “place with a lot of smoke”. The Villa de Guerrero part is in honor of Vicente Guerrero, a hero of the Mexican War of Independence. Putla became the seat of its municipality in 1907 and is located 374 km from the city of Oaxaca.

It connects the Mixtec region with the coast of Oaxaca and is a commercial center for the Mixtecs, Amuzgos, and Chatinos that live in the area.

The municipality

As municipal seat, Putla has governing jurisdiction over the following communities:

Agua Dulce, Asunción Atoyaquillo, Barranca del Cuche (Barranca del Jabalí), Barrio Guadalupe Yutee, Barrio Palo de Obo, Chapultepec, Charloco, Concepción de Guerrero, Concepción del Progreso, Desviación de la Hacienda, El Camalote, El Campanario, El Cangrejo, El Carmen, El Carrizal de Galeana, El Chorrito de Agua, El Limón, El Sesteadero, Gregorio, Alvarez, Hidalgo, Jicaltepec, Joya del Mamey Copala, Joya Grande, La Cañada Tejocote, La Laguna Guadalupe, La Muralla, La Orilla del Peñasco, La Palizada, La Soledad, La Tortolita, La Trovadora (Loma Trovadora), Las Palmas, Llano de Aguacate, Llano de San Vicente, Llano de Zaragoza, Loma Flor de Sangre (Loma del Tecolote), Malpica, Miguel Hidalgo Chicahuaxtla, Morelos, Nuevo Tenochtitlán, Ocote Amargo, Pie del Encino (Loma de Rayo), Plan de Ayala, Plan de Guajolote, Pueblo Viejo, Río de las Peñas, Río Frío, San Andrés Chicahuaxtla, San Antonio Acatlán, San Antonio de Juárez, San Antonio Dos Caminos, San Isidro de Morelos, San Isidro del Estado, San Jorge Río Frijol, San Juan Lagunas, San Juan las Huertas, San Juan Teponaxstla, San Marcos Coyulito, San Marcos Malpica, San Marcos Mesoncito, San Miguel Copala, San Miguel Reyes, San Pedro Siniyuvi, Santa Cruz Progreso Chicahuaxtla, Santa Rosa, Santa Rosa Hidalgo, Santiago Amate Colorado, Santiago Yosotiche, Santo Domingo del Estado, Suspiros, Tierra Blanca, Tierra Colorada, Unión Nacional, Zafra, Zaragoza Siniyuvi, Zimatlán, colonia san jose and colonia san angel. San Juan teponaxtla

References

Municipalities of Oaxaca